China Superbike Championship (CSBK) is a motorcycle racing championship organized in China by China Motorcycle Sports Association and promoted by Zhuhai International Circuit. It was first established in 2007.  The 150cc Open Class allowed for engine modification and Feiying Racing commissioned Wiseco Piston to build and prep 4 race engines for the series.  These engines powered Feiying to the 2007 Championship and S&S Racing to the 2008 Championship.

There was four championship rounds in 2007. Two at Zhuhai International Circuit, one at Beijing Goldenport Park Circuit and one at Shanghai's Tianma Circuit. The last China Superbike Championship took place in Tianjin (2019).

Establishment
The China Superbike Championship is established in 2007 by China Motor Sport Association, FIM's Chinese member. The promotional rights and organization responsibilities are granted to Zhuhai International Circuit, China.

Regulations
CSBK has three technical classes, they are:
 150cc Open class
 GP125cc
 Supersports 600cc

GP125cc is also divided into GP125A and GP125B for riders of different experience, though they race together.

Only Chinese riders (including riders from Hong Kong SAR, Macau SAR and Taiwan) are admitted to the championship.

Champions

2007 schedule
 9–10 June: Zhuhai International Circuit
 14–15 July: Goldenport Park Circuit, Beijing
 25–26 August: Tianma Circuit, Shanghai
 1 – 2 Oct: Zhuhai International Circuit

2008 schedule

 29–30 March: Zhuhai International Circuit
 19–20 April: Tianma Circuit, Shanghai
 31 May – 1 June: Goldenport Park Circuit, Beijing
 11 – 12 Oct: Zhuhai International Circuit

References

External links
Official website

Superbike racing
Motorsport competitions in China
2007 establishments in China
Superbike
Motorcycle racing in China